Catch Me! is an album by jazz guitarist Joe Pass that was released in 1963.

Track listing

Personnel
 Joe Pass – guitar
 Clare Fischer – piano, organ
 Ralph Peña – double bass
 Albert Stinson – double bass
 Colin Bailey – drums
 Larry Bunker – drums

References

1963 albums
Joe Pass albums
Pacific Jazz Records albums